The 2013–14 1. FC Nürnberg season is the 114th season in the club's football history.

Review and events
In 2013–14 the club plays in the Bundesliga, the top tier of German football. It is the clubs fifth consecutive season in this league, having been promoted from the 2. Bundesliga in 2009.

The club also took part in the 2013–14 edition of the DFB-Pokal, the German Cup, where it was knocked out by 2. Bundesliga side SV Sandhausen, losing 4–3 on penalties.

Matches

Legend

Friendly matches

DFB-Pokal

Bundesliga

League table

League results and fixtures

Overall

Sources

External links
 2013–14 1. FC Nürnberg season at Weltfussball.de 
 2013–14 1. FC Nürnberg season at kicker.de 
 2013–14 1. FC Nürnberg season at Fussballdaten.de 

Nuremberg
1. FC Nürnberg seasons